Kharestan-e Olya or Kharastan Olya may refer to:
 Kharestan-e Olya, Fars
 Kharestan-e Olya, Khuzestan